Jamie Spence (born 11 July 1973) is a British auto racing driver. He was British Formula Ford champion in 1992. He went on to be 1993 British Formula Three national class champion. In 1996 he competed in the final two rounds of the British Touring Car Championship at Brands Hatch for Rouse Sport in a Nissan Primera.

Racing record

Complete British Touring Car Championship results
(key) (Races in bold indicate pole position - 1 point awarded all races) (Races in italics indicate fastest lap)

References

External links
Jamie Spence at driver database

British Touring Car Championship drivers
British Formula Three Championship drivers
1973 births
Living people
Formula Ford drivers
Barber Pro Series drivers
Carlin racing drivers
Fortec Motorsport drivers
TOM'S drivers